"Girl from Rio" is a song by Brazilian singer Anitta from her fifth studio album Versions of Me. It was released as the second single from the album through Warner Records on April 29, 2021. A song about Anitta's own life, it interpolates "The Girl from Ipanema" by Vinicius de Moraes and Tom Jobim. A remix of the song featuring American rapper DaBaby was released on May 21, 2021, and was sent to US and European radio stations on May 25.

Background
On March 30, 2021, Anitta began teasing the release of the song on her Instagram by posting black and white photos of the city of Rio de Janeiro in the 1960s and 1970s, as well as trivial contents regarding recordings of the song "The Girl from Ipanema", a bossa nova classic composed by Vinícius de Moraes and Tom Jobim in the voices of Astrud Gilberto, Frank Sinatra, Amy Winehouse, and Ella Fitzgerald, and photos of anonymous Carioca women and famous figures, such as actresses Taís Araújo, Carolina Dieckmann and Fernanda Montenegro; by singer Fernanda Abreu; models Roberta Close and Helô Pinheiro (who inspired the music of Moraes and Jobim); of the twin athletes Bia and Branca Feres; and the late political and activist Marielle Franco.

"Girl from Rio" is the second single from Anitta's fifth album Versions of Me, released via Warner Music on April 12, 2022. The song interpolates Vinicius de Moraes and Tom Jobim's bossa nova classic "The Girl from Ipanema" (in original Portuguese, A Garota de Ipanema). According to Anitta, while working on an early draft of "Girl from Rio", producers Stargate suggested using a sample of "The Girl from Ipanema" on the song. She immediately agreed to the idea, however, she said it was not easy to acquire the rights to use the sample, thus she had to intervene herself. Anitta claims to have contacted Jobim and Moraes' respective families to explain her intentions with the use of the sample; she was eventually allowed to use the sample on "Girl from Rio" but had to fully give up on publishing rights on the song.

Despite singing in English on the song, Anitta considers "Girl from Rio" one of her most personal works as she aimed at bringing together as much of Brazilian culture and her own life experiences as possible. While at a studio recording the song, Anitta received a text message containing a link to a story on a Brazilian newspaper in which it had been published there were rumors that she had a half-brother. This led producers Stargate to suggest Anitta to include a verse on the song commenting about her newly discovered half-brother.

A remix featuring American rapper DaBaby was released on May 21, 2021.

Music video 
The music video for "Girl from Rio" was shot at Piscinão de Ramos, a leisure area in Rio de Janeiro, and also in a studio where the Ipanema beach was reproduced. The Giovanni Bianco-directed video was released simultaneously with the song,

The video intercalates from scenes of Anitta and her family having fun at Piscinão de Ramos to a studio footage of Anitta as a glamorous redhead with colorful and vintage visuals in a recreated 1960s Ipanema. Anitta's vintage visuals on the video were inspired on the 2020s television series Ratched and Sarah Paulson's character Nurse Ratched, as well as the general aesthetic of the 1960s. Carmen Miranda's performances were also mentioned as inspirations for the video's easthetic.

Remix version
The music video for the remix version featuring DaBaby was released on May 28, 2021, and was directed by Giovanni Bianco.

Commercial performance

Live performances and Accolades 
Anitta first performed the song on May 2, 2021, on Fantástico. The next day, she sang the song on Today. On May 5, she performed the song on Jimmy Kimmel Live!, and on May 9, she performed it at Ellas y Su Música. Anitta also performed the song at the 2021 MTV Video Music Awards as part of an advertisement for Burger King.

Charts

Weekly charts

DaBaby Remix

Monthly charts

Year-end charts

Certifications

References

2021 singles
2021 songs
Anitta (singer) songs
DaBaby songs
Warner Records singles
Songs about Rio de Janeiro (city)
Songs with music by Antônio Carlos Jobim
Songs with lyrics by Vinicius de Moraes
Songs written by Anitta (singer)
Songs with lyrics by Norman Gimbel
Trap music songs